was a Japanese diplomat and Olympic Games activist.

Biography
He was born on March 5, 1877, in Aichi Prefecture.

He served in the Japanese delegation to the League of Nations in 1920, and served as Japanese Ambassador to Sweden and Finland in 1925–1930. In 1930, he formed part of the Japanese delegation to the London Naval Conference. He served as Ambassador to Germany from April 1933 to October 1934. In 1936, he served as Minister of Transportation, and was an active supporter of naval expansion plans. In 1937, he was active in the Japanese governmental committee which was charged with preparing the Olympic games scheduled to take place in Tokyo in 1940, which was eventually cancelled. He also served as a member of the International Olympic Committee in 1939–1950. He received the Grand Cross of the Royal Swedish Order of the Polar Star in 1928. He died on April 19, 1957.

See also
 List of Ambassadors of Japan to Finland
 List of Japanese ministers, envoys and ambassadors to Germany

References

External links

 Hiroshi Momose, Japan's Relations with Finland, 1919–1944, as Reflected by Japanese Source Materials
 Ricky W. Law, "Runner-up: Japan in the German Mass Media during the 1936 Olympic Games" Southeast Review of Asian Studies, 31 (2009) 164–180
 Article about Nagai's activities for holding olympic games in Japan

|-

|-

|-

|-

|-

Ambassadors of Japan to Belgium
Ambassadors of Japan to Denmark
Ambassadors of Japan to Finland
Ambassadors of Japan to Germany
Ambassadors of Japan to Norway
Ambassadors of Japan to Sweden
Permanent Representatives of Japan to the League of Nations
International Olympic Committee members
Government ministers of Japan
1877 births
1957 deaths
Members of the House of Peers (Japan)
Recipients of the Order of the Sacred Treasure, 1st class
Grand Cordons of the Order of the Rising Sun